The Nashville Sounds Minor League Baseball team has played in Nashville, Tennessee, since being established in 1978 as an expansion team of the Double-A Southern League (SL). They moved up to Triple-A in 1985 as members of the American Association (AA) before joining the Pacific Coast League (PCL) in 1998. The team was placed in the Triple-A East in 2021 prior to this becoming the International League in 2022. In the history of the franchise, numerous teams, players, and personnel have won awards, been selected for All-Star teams, or led their league in various statistical areas in a single season.

Three Sounds have won league Most Valuable Player (MVP) awards: Steve Balboni, Brian Dayett, and Magglio Ordóñez. Ten have won Pitcher of the Year awards: Bruce Berenyi, Geoff Combe, Andy McGaffigan, Jamie Werly, Stefan Wever, Chris Hammond, Scott Ruffcorn, R. A. Dickey, Johnny Hellweg, and Jimmy Nelson. Two have won Rookie of the Year awards: Jeff Abbott and Magglio Ordóñez. Five managers have won Manager of the Year awards: Stump Merrill, Rick Renick, Frank Kremblas, Steve Scarsone, and Rick Sweet. Ordóñez won the 1997 AA MVP Award as well as the Rookie of the Year Award, making him the only Nashville player to win two year-end league awards for the same season. The only other team personnel to win multiple league awards, though in separate seasons, are Renick, who won the AA Manager of the Year Award in 1993 and 1996, President Larry Schmittou, who won the SL Executive of the Year Award in 1978 and the AA Executive of the Year Award in 1987 and 1989, and radio broadcaster Bob Jamison, who was named the SL Broadcaster of the Year in 1980 and 1982. The franchise was recognized with the Minor League Baseball Organization of the Year Award in 2022. The team won the Larry MacPhail Award in 1978, 1980, and 1981. Two managers have won the Mike Coolbaugh Award: Mike Guerrero and Rick Sweet. Twenty-five Sounds have been selected by their Major League Baseball organization for player or pitcher of the year awards.

Four Sounds have been selected to participate in the All-Star Futures Game. Seventy-six players and seven managers and coaches have been selected for midseason All-Star teams. Of these, Drew Denson, Vinny Rottino, Scott Ruffcorn, Joey Vierra, and Jamie Werly are the only players to have been selected twice while playing for Nashville. Four players have been chosen as the MVP for their contributions in All-Star games: Duane Walker, Ray Durham, Magglio Ordóñez, and Renato Núñez. Of the 52 players who have been named to postseason All-Star teams, only Duane Walker and Jeff Abbott have been selected twice.

A number of players have led their league in multiple statistical categories during a single season. Steve Balboni led the 1980 Southern League season in five categories: runs (101), runs batted in (122), total bases (288), home runs (30), and fielding percentage among first basemen (.990). Chris Hammond led the American Association in five areas in 1990: wins (15), winning percentage (.938 (15–1)), earned run average (2.17), strikeouts (149), and shutouts (3). Skeeter Barnes (1990), Norberto Martin (1993), Drew Denson (1994), Magglio Ordóñez (1997), and Joey Wendle (2015) led single seasons in four areas each. The 1980 Sounds led the Southern League in 22 categories, the most among all Sounds teams.

Key

Awards

League awards

Southern League

These players and team personnel won Southern League year-end awards during the club's membership from 1978 to 1984.

American Association

These players and team personnel won American Association year-end awards during the club's membership from 1985 to 1997.

Pacific Coast League

These players and team personnel won Pacific Coast League year-end awards during the club's membership from 1998 to 2020.

International League

These team personnel have won International League year-end awards during the club's membership since 2021.

Minor League Baseball awards

These teams and team personnel won Minor League Baseball year-end awards.

Major League Baseball organizational awards

These players won year-end awards from their Major League Baseball organization.

All-Stars

All-Star Futures

These players were selected to play in the All-Star Futures Game (1999–present).

Midseason All-Stars

These players were selected to play in the Southern League All-Star Game (1978–1984) or the Triple-A All-Star Game (1988–present).

All-Star Game MVPs

These players won Most Valuable Player (MVP) Awards for their contributions in the Southern League All-Star Game (1978–1984) or the Triple-A All-Star Game (1988–present).

Postseason All-Stars

These players were voted onto league postseason All-Star teams.

League leaders

Individual leaders

Batting leaders
These players led all other players in their league with the best performance in distinct statistical batting categories in a single season. A batter must have at least 2.7 plate appearances per the number of scheduled regular-season games to qualify for the lead in batting average, on-base percentage, slugging percentage, or on-base plus slugging.

Pitching leaders
These pitchers led all other pitchers in their league with the best performance in distinct statistical pitching categories in a single season. A pitcher must have pitched at least as many innings as 80 percent of the number of scheduled regular-season games to qualify for the lead in earned run average or walks plus hits per inning pitched. To qualify for the lead in winning percentage, they must meet the preceding innings threshold and have any combination of wins and losses totaling at least ten.

Fielding leaders
These players led all other players in their league with the highest fielding percentage at their playing position in a single season. To qualify as a leader, catchers must have participated at that position in at least half of scheduled regular-season games. Infielders and outfielders must have participated at their positions in at least two-thirds of scheduled regular-season games. Pitchers must have pitched as many innings as the number of scheduled regular-season games unless another pitcher has an equal or greater percentage with more total chances in fewer innings.

Team leaders
These Sounds teams led all other teams in their league with the best performance in distinct statistical categories in a single season.

General leaders

Batting leaders

Pitching leaders

Fielding leaders

Notes

References
Specific

General

Award winners